Antakasina is a town and commune in Madagascar. It belongs to the district of Ambatolampy, which is a part of Vakinankaratra Region. The population of the commune was estimated to be approximately 14,000 in 2001 commune census.

Only primary schooling is available. It is also a site of industrial-scale  mining. The majority 98% of the population of the commune are farmers.  The most important crops are rice and potatoes; also maize is an important agricultural product. Industry and services provide employment for 1.75% and 0.25% of the population, respectively.

References and notes 

Populated places in Vakinankaratra